It Was Great Altogether TSCD680T subtitled The continuing tradition of Irish music in London is the second album in the fourth series of The Voice of the People from Topic Records.

Introduction
This compilation follows the development of London-Irish music from the 1950s to the present time mad presents recordings from Topic records back catalogue and many private collections.

Reg Hall defines the booklet of the other compilation in the series, the 'London-Irish' as a distinct ethnic community of settled migrants and their offspring with topping up from a constant trickle of immigrants from Ireland. On this second compilation most of the musicians were raised in Ireland with a few from London, some of whom travelled to Ireland for holidays.

The Compiler
Reg Hall has been active in Irish music in London since the 1950s having been invited by Michael Gorman to join his band in 1956.  His involvement in documenting the phenomena continued when he co-produced Paddy in the Smoke with Bill Leader in 1968, recorded in The Favourite public house in Holloway.  A number of other recordings followed as well as continuing to play in sessions around London.

A large number of the tracks selected feature him providing accompaniment on either piano or keyboard for the dance tunes.

Packaging
The album consists of a cardboard case with a card CD holder for the three CDs and a booklet for the sleeve notes.

Cardboard case
The cardboard case does not detail the tracks in the compilation but does identify all the musicians and in the brief notes explains the place of Irish music in the lives of the migrant population in the 1950s.  The notes then continue to explain that this album covers the period after the 1950s up to the present day.

Booklet
The booklet consists of 106 pages and follows a similar sequence to the other albums in the series.
	About the Editor – written by Tony Engle Managing Director of Topic Records
	The Voice of the People – Detailing the concept and philosophy of the series of compilations
	It Was Great Altogether – A commentary on the album and the social context of the Irish music within London.  The first and second CDs cover music produced by the original migrants and the third is recordings made more recently with some older migrants together with second and third generation Londoners.
CD1, CD2 and CD3.  These three sections details the tunes being played on the CDs together with a brief biography of each of the musicians and a history of the recordings in track order.
Track lists.  The track lists for the three CDs are listed with the artist details and running time.

The Recordings
The album consists of three CDs of recordings made of London Irish Musicians who have worked and played in London from 1964 to 2014.  The majority of recordings were made in London.  Many of the recordings were made by private individuals with a number from various organisations and individuals including  Bob Davenport, Bill Leader, Reg Hall, Peter Bellamy, Resonance 104.4 FM, RTÉ and Radio na Gaeltachta.

CD1
The CD contains recordings from 1965 to 1998.

A number of the tracks on the CD were recorded in The Favourite, Holloway.  7 of the tracks recorded by Bill Leader in addition to the tracks on Paddy in the Smoke, with 2 other tracks recorded by Edward Tise.

Tom Cussen both plays on and records track 13.

Tracks 1 and 2 were originally released on the Topic records album Memories of Sligo which is available as a download.

CD2
The CD contains recordings from 1964 to 2014.

1 track was recorded by Lucy Farr in The Favourite, Holloway.  Tom Cussen both plays and/or records on a number of tracks.

The musicians in the Thatch Ceili Band are Bobby Casey, Brendan Mulkere & Adrian Bourke(fiddles), Roger Sherlock & Paul Gallagher(flutes), Tommy Keane(uilleann pipes), John Bowe(accordion), Mick O’Connor(banjo), Kevin Taylor(piano), Mick Whelan(drums).

CD3
The CD brings the scene up to date with recordings from 1988 to 2014.

The musicians in The Auld Triangle Ceili Band are Teresa Heanue & Sinead Linane(fiddles), James Carty, Mick Mulvey & John Murphy(flutes), Gary Connolly & Maureen Linane(accordions), Karen Ryan(banjo), Reg Hall(piano), Pat McNamee(drums).

References

Topic Records albums
2016 compilation albums